Utetheisa latifascia is a moth in the family Erebidae. It was described by Carl Heinrich Hopffer in 1874. It is found on Sulawesi.

References

Moths described in 1874
latifascia
Taxa named by Carl Heinrich Hopffer